Igor Ilyich Dudinsky (31 March 1947 – 11 June 2022) was a Soviet and Russian journalist, writer, art critic, and visual artist.

Biography
Dudinsky was born in Moscow in the family of the international economist Ilya Vladimirovich Dudinsky.

He was an active participant in the Moscow bohemian life. In 1965 he entered the MSU Faculty of Economics. He began to participate in the dissident movement and on 5 December 1965, he went to a demonstration in defense of Andrei Sinyavsky and Yuli Daniel, after which he was expelled from the university.

He worked as a special correspondent for Ogoniok Magazine.

He was a Moscow correspondent for the literary and artistic almanac  Muleta  and the newspaper  Evening Bell, which were published by the artist and art critic  who had emigrated to Paris. He was the deputy editor-in-chief of   newspaper Literary News. He founded and published the newspaper  The Last Pole  and the magazine  Continent Russia.

In 2007 he became the first deputy editor-in-chief of the Moscow Correspondent newspaper. In 2021, Dudinsky's fifth book  Four Sisters  was published

Family
Married for the thirteenth time. Daughter  —  film director Valeriya Gai Germanika.

References

External links

 Official website

1947 births
2022 deaths
Soviet journalists
Russian journalists
Journalists from Moscow
Writers from Moscow
Russian newspaper editors
Russian male writers
Russian art historians
Soviet painters
Russian male painters